Zomaria is a genus of moths belonging to the subfamily Olethreutinae of the family Tortricidae.

Species
Zomaria andromedana (Barnes & McDunnough, 1917)
Zomaria interruptolineana (Fernald, 1882)
Zomaria rosaochreana (Kearfott, 1907)

See also
List of Tortricidae genera

References

External links
Tortricid.net

Tortricidae genera
Olethreutinae